14th Division may refer to:

Infantry divisions :
 14th Infantry Division (France)
 14th Division (German Empire)
 14th Infantry Division (Germany)
 14th Infantry Division (Greece)
 14th Indian Division – British Indian Army during World War I
 14th Indian Infantry Division – British Indian Army during World War II
 14th Infantry Division Isonzo – Kingdom of Italy
 14th Division (Imperial Japanese Army)
 14th Infantry Division (Poland)
 14th Infantry Division (Russian Empire)
 14th Division (Spain)
 14th (Light) Division – British Army during World War I
 14th Rifle Division (Soviet Union)

Armored divisions :
 14th Panzer Division (Germany)
 14th Armored Division (United States)